This is a list of all of the United States Supreme Court cases from volume 342 of the United States Reports:

External links

1951 in United States case law
1952 in United States case law